Progress M-13 was a Russian uncrewed cargo spacecraft which was launched in 1992 to resupply the Mir space station. The thirty-first of sixty four Progress spacecraft to visit Mir, it used the Progress-M 11F615A55 configuration, and had the serial number 214. It carried supplies including food, water and oxygen for the EO-11 crew aboard Mir, as well as equipment for conducting scientific research, and fuel for adjusting the station's orbit and performing manoeuvres.

Progress M-13 was launched at 16:43:13 GMT on 30 June 1992, atop a Soyuz-U2 carrier rocket flying from Site 31/6 at the Baikonur Cosmodrome. Following four days of free flight, it docked with the Forward port of Mir's core module at 12:38 GMT on 4 July. An earlier docking attempt on 2 July had been unsuccessful. Progress M-13 undocked from Mir at 04:14:00 GMT on 24 July to make way for Soyuz TM-15, and was deorbited few hours later, to a destructive reentry over the Pacific Ocean at around 08:03:35.

See also

1992 in spaceflight
List of Progress missions
List of uncrewed spaceflights to Mir

References

Spacecraft launched in 1992
Progress (spacecraft) missions